The Seoul Station City Airport Terminal (SCAT) at Seoul Station, Seoul, is one of South Korea's Airport terminals. It is part of the AREX Line.

The Seoul Station City Airport Terminal is a public transportation facility in which travellers on certain flights can check in their luggage at the Seoul Station before leaving for the airport as well as going through immigration for expedited entry once at the airport. As of February, 2015, the Seoul Station City Airport Terminal only supports flights for Asiana Airlines, Korean Air, Jeju Air and certain other airlines that codeshare with Asiana Airlines.

References

External links
 

Airport terminals
Buildings and structures in Yongsan District
Airport railway stations in South Korea
Railway stations in Seoul